Mykelti Williamson (born March 4, 1957) is an American actor best known for his roles in the films Forrest Gump, Con Air and Ali, and the television shows Boomtown, 24, and Justified. In 2016, he portrayed Gabriel Maxson in Denzel Washington's acclaimed film adaptation of August Wilson's play Fences, reprising his role from the 2010 Broadway revival.

His other notable roles include Free Willy, Heat, Lucky Number Slevin, Three Kings, Black Dynamite, The Final Destination, ATL, Species II, and The Purge: Election Year.

Early life
Williamson was born in St. Louis, Missouri. He is the son of Elaine, a certified public accountant, and a father who was an Air Force Non-Commissioned Officer. He is of African American descent and has stated he has Blackfoot ancestry. He has said that his name "Mykelti" means "spirit" in the Blackfoot language, but this is untrue.

Williamson began performing at the age of nine. Along with acting, he also danced as an alternate member of The Lockers troupe on Soul Train along with Fred Berry (star of TV sitcom What's Happening!!). At age nine, Williamson relocated to Los Angeles with his family. He studied television and film at Los Angeles City College. He audited acting classes at USC under the tutelage of Dr. Frank X. Ford Williamson, and was later transferred to Gene Evans Motion Picture School in San Jose, earning his certificate in Cinematography/Film Production.

Career
Williamson began acting professionally as a child. His first TV appearances include Starsky and Hutch, Father Murphy, Hill Street Blues, Miami Vice, China Beach, and Midnight Caller. Perhaps his best-known television role was as program director Donovan Aderhold in the syndicated series The New WKRP in Cincinnati. Williamson also starred in PBS's TV series The Righteous Apples. The show focuses on the activities of The Righteous Apples, five Boston-area high school musicians, who in a troubled world, seek to help people in distress. Williamson was the lead singer of the group in the show in which he was just a teenager at that time.

His film debut was in Streets of Fire (1984). His credits include Wildcats (1986) with Goldie Hawn, Miracle Mile (1989), The First Power (1990) with Lou Diamond Phillips, Free Willy (1993), Forrest Gump (1994) with Tom Hanks, Waiting to Exhale (1995), Heat (1995), Soul of the Game (1996) with Delroy Lindo, Con Air (1997), Truth or Consequences, N.M. (1997), William Friedkin's TV version of 12 Angry Men (1997), Three Kings (1999), Having Our Say: The Delany Sisters' First 100 Years (1999), Holiday Heart (2000), Black Dynamite (2009), The Final Destination (2009), and The Purge: Election Year (2016).

Williamson is best known as Private Benjamin Buford "Bubba" Blue in the Academy Award–winning 1994 film Forrest Gump. He also received favorable reviews when he played Negro league baseball player Josh Gibson in the HBO film Soul of the Game (1996).

Williamson has made many guest appearances in TV and film. His most recent film appearances have included Ali (2001),The Assassination of Richard Nixon (2004), Get Rich or Die Tryin' (2005), ATL (2006), Lucky Number Slevin (2006), August Rush (2007), High School (2010), Convergence (2015), and Fences (2016). He was Juror #10 in the 1997 TV movie remake of 12 Angry Men (picking up the Ed Begley role). He also appeared in a short-lived TV series remake The Fugitive (CBS, 2000–2001). CBS cancelled the series after one season with a total of 22 episodes.

In 2002, he co-starred as Detective Bobby "Fearless" Smith in the critically acclaimed but commercially unsuccessful crime drama Boomtown.

Between 2007 and 2009, he appeared in seven episodes of CSI: NY as Chief Sinclair, reuniting him with his Forrest Gump co-star Gary Sinise. He was a main character in season 8 of 24 starring as Brian Hastings, the special agent in charge of the New York CTU.

He had a recurring role as Ellstin Limehouse on the FX drama Justified. He was also cast as a homeless man named Terry in the third season of the ABC drama Nashville. Since October 2016, Williamson has had a recurring role as Admiral Chernow in Designated Survivor. In 2017, he began appearing on Chicago P.D..

Personal life

Williamson was married to Miami Vice star Olivia Brown from July 2, 1983 until they divorced in 1985. He later married Cheryl Chisholm in 1989 with whom he had his first child, Phoenix.

He has been married to Sondra Spriggs since April 26, 1997; together they have two daughters, Nicole and Maya. The two were married during the filming of TNT's production of Buffalo Soldiers.

Williamson was charged with attempted murder in 1998 after he stabbed his ex-wife's boyfriend.The judge in that case denied further prosecution due to insufficient evidence.

Filmography

Film

Television

References

External links
 
 
 

1957 births
20th-century American male actors
21st-century American male actors
African-American male actors
American male film actors
American male television actors
Living people
Los Angeles City College alumni
Male actors from St. Louis
20th-century African-American people
21st-century African-American people